Arthur Robertson Hoare (17 October 1871 – 18 March 1941) was an English first-class cricketer and clergyman.

Life
The son of the Reverend Walter Marsham Hoare, he was born in October 1871 at Stibbard, Norfolk. He was educated at Eton College, before going up to Trinity College, Cambridge. While at Cambridge, he played football for Cambridge University A.F.C., gaining a football blue. After graduating from Cambridge, he became an Anglican clergyman. He was a curate at Kettering from 1894–1897. He went to South Africa in 1897, where he was a diocese chaplain at Cape Town until 1900. He served in the Second Boer War as a chaplain to the forces.

Hoare continued his role as chaplain to the forces until 1909, holding postings at the Royal Military Academy and at Colchester Garrison. He returned to service as a chaplain to the forces in World War I, during which he was mentioned in dispatches.

Following the war, he served as the rector of Colkirk until 1930, and the rector of Ashill from 1930 to 1941. He died at Ashill in March 1941.

Cricketer
Hoare made his debut in minor counties cricket for Norfolk in 1895. Upon his return to England, he played a single first-class cricket match for the Marylebone Cricket Club (MCC) against Oxford University at Oxford in 1903. Batting twice in the match, he was dismissed for 4 runs in the MCC first-innings by William Evans, while in their second-innings he was dismissed for 41 runs by Robert Darling. He also bowled nine wicketless overs across the match. He resumed playing minor counties cricket for Norfolk until 1907, making a further seventeen appearances in the Minor Counties Championship.

Family
Hoare was married twice, firstly to Mabel Pensie Marsham, daughter of John Marsham in August 1902, the couple having three children. He was widowed in 1928, later marrying his late wife's sister Evelyn Florence Marsham in October 1930.

References

External links

1871 births
1941 deaths
People from North Norfolk (district)
People educated at Eton College
Alumni of Trinity College, Cambridge
Cambridge University A.F.C. players
19th-century English Anglican priests
English cricketers
Norfolk cricketers
20th-century English Anglican priests
English military chaplains
Boer War chaplains
Marylebone Cricket Club cricketers
World War I chaplains
English footballers
People from Ashill, Norfolk
British Army personnel of the Second Boer War
British Army personnel of World War I
Association footballers not categorized by position